Christopher Clemons (born October 30, 1981) is a former American football defensive end. He played college football at Georgia, and signed with the Washington Redskins as an undrafted free agent in 2003. Clemons has also played for the Oakland Raiders, Philadelphia Eagles, Jacksonville Jaguars and the Seattle Seahawks.

Early years
Clemons attended Griffin High School in Griffin, Georgia, where he was a four-year letterman and three-year starter for the football team.  He was named AAA-All Region first-team and nominated for Region MVP by the Georgia Athletic Coaches Association.  He recorded 49 tackles, six sacks, two interceptions, one fumble recovery and one forced fumble his senior year, as well as rushed for 80 yards on ten carries and 12 receptions for 159 yards and three touchdowns. He was also a member of the track team.

College career
Clemons was recruited by the University of Georgia in 1999.  He started the 2000 season opener recording seven tackles, but then suffered a shoulder injury early in the season that sidelined him for several games.  He played in 11 games in 2001, starting three of them.  He played in 12 games with ten starts during his junior season, recording 53 tackles, and one sack.  He was then named Most Improved Linebacker of 2002.

Professional career

Washington Redskins
After being undrafted in the 2003 NFL Draft,
Clemons signed with the Washington Redskins. However, he spent that entire season on injured reserve after suffering a torn ACL.  He spent the 2004 training camp with the Redskins, but was released prior to the start of the regular season.

Cleveland Browns
Clemons was signed to the Cleveland Browns practice squad after being cut by the Redskins.

Washington Redskins (second stint)
He was re-signed to the Redskins' active roster on November 24, 2004, where he began to establish himself in the Redskins' defense, recording three sacks as a speed rusher late in the season. Clemons signed with the Washington Redskins again for the 2005 season where he played in 14 games and had eight tackles, two sacks, a blocked punt, and a forced fumble.

Oakland Raiders
Clemons played the 2007 season with the Oakland Raiders, primarily playing as a situational pass rusher before becoming a free agent.

Philadelphia Eagles
On March 1, 2008, Clemons signed a five-year contract with the Philadelphia Eagles. He is well known for stiff-arming of Tashard Choice on a fumble return touchdown in a playoff-clinching game versus the Dallas Cowboys on December 28, 2008, and body-slamming Tarvaris Jackson in the subsequent first-round playoff game.

Seattle Seahawks
On March 16, 2010, Clemons was traded with a fourth round pick by the Eagles to the Seattle Seahawks in exchange for Darryl Tapp.

He was originally brought in to play the Leo position in Pete Carroll's defensive 4-3 over scheme, but with the injury of Red Bryant after Week 7, Raheem Brock was moved into his place and Clemons moved to starting left defensive end.

Clemons led the team with a career-high 11 sacks in both 2010 and 2011.

On September 24, 2012, Clemons recorded four sacks, all in the first half, in a victory over the Green Bay Packers.

On January 6, 2013, Clemons suffered a torn ACL in a 24-14 playoff victory over the Washington Redskins. Clemons was later placed on injured reserve. On September 20, 2013 the Seahawks announced Clemons will play for his season debut in Week 3 against the Jacksonville Jaguars. Clemons and the Seahawks went on to win Super Bowl XLVIII that season.

On March 12, 2014, Clemons was released by the Seahawks.

Jacksonville Jaguars
On March 13, 2014, Clemons signed a four-year, $17.5 million contract with the Jacksonville Jaguars.

The Jaguars released Clemons on March 3, 2016.

Seattle Seahawks (second stint)
On April 1, 2016, Clemons agreed to terms in a deal to return to the Seattle Seahawks. On July 28, 2016, he informed the team that he planned to retire.

References

External links

Jacksonville Jaguars bio
Seattle Seahawks bio

1981 births
Living people
People from Griffin, Georgia
Players of American football from Georgia (U.S. state)
American football linebackers
American football defensive ends
Georgia Bulldogs football players
Washington Redskins players
Cleveland Browns players
Oakland Raiders players
Philadelphia Eagles players
Seattle Seahawks players
Jacksonville Jaguars players
Ed Block Courage Award recipients